Occhieppo may refer to the following places in the Province of Biella, Piedmont, Italy:

Occhieppo Inferiore
Occhieppo Superiore